Terry Henley is a former American football player.  Henley played college football for the Auburn Tigers and was named first-team All-SEC in 1972.  He was signed as a free agent by the Atlanta Falcons in 1973 but was cut during training camp. Henley signed to play for the Birmingham Americans of the World Football League in 1974 but was cut from the team just before the season began. The Washington Redskins invited Henley to their training camp in August 1974 but he failed to make the team.  In February 1975, Henley signed on to the New England Patriots as a free agent but was cut from the roster before the start of the regular season.  Henley announced in 1976 that he would no longer pursue a career in professional football and turned to Birmingham, Alabama, to sell insurance.

Henley was inducted into the Alabama Sports Hall of Fame in the Class of 2000.  He was inducted into the Calhoun County Sports Hall of Fame in 2006.  Henley was also elected to the Auburn Tigers football "1970s Team of the Decade".

References

1950s births
Living people
People from Oxford, Alabama
Players of American football from Alabama
American football running backs
Auburn Tigers football players